Marcel Van Langenhove (born 16 April 1944) is a Belgian politician and a former football referee.

He refereed one game at the 1990 FIFA World Cup, between Ireland and Egypt.

He was the mayor of his native city of Wemmel from 2001 until 2010.

External links
 Profile at worldreferee.com

1944 births
Living people
Belgian politicians
Belgian football referees
1990 FIFA World Cup referees
Mayors of places in Belgium
Sportspeople from Flemish Brabant
Belgian sportsperson-politicians